Our Revolution is a book by Leon Trotsky, published in 1906. Its final article, "Results and Prospects", became the most important and famous part of the work. In the book, Trotsky completed formation of his concept of "permanent revolution" and "the law of uneven and combined development". It blamed the failure of the 1905 Russian Revolution on the inability of the bourgeoisie to lead a liberal democratic revolution, and as such indicated the beginning of Trotsky's ideological shift from the Mensheviks to the Bolsheviks.

References

Literature 
 Knei-Paz B. The Social and Political Thought of Leon Trotsky. — 1st. — Oxford University Press, 1978. — 652 p. — .
 Saccarelli E. Gramsci and Trotsky in the Shadow of Stalinism: The Political Theory and Practice of Opposition. — Routledge, 2008. — 320 p. — .
 Brossat A. Aux origines de la révolution permanente: la pensée politique du jeune Trotsky. — F. Maspero, 1974. — 319 p. — (Les Textes à l'appui. Histoire contemporaine).
 Howard M. C., King J. E. Trotsky on Uneven and Combined Development // A History of Marxian Economics. — Princeton University Press, 1989. — Т. I: 1883—1929. — 374 p. — (Princeton Legacy Library, 1). — .
 Löwy M. Permanent revolution in Russia // The Politics of Combined and Uneven Development: The Theory of Permanent Revolution. — Haymarket Books, 2010. — 162 p. — .

1906 non-fiction books
Works by Leon Trotsky